Georg Johansson may refer to:
Georg Johansson (ice hockey)
Georg Johansson (footballer)